The 1999 Imo State gubernatorial election occurred in Nigeria on January 9, 1999. The PDP nominee Achike Udenwa won the election, defeating the APP candidate.

Achike Udenwa emerged PDP candidate.

Electoral system
The Governor of Imo State is elected using the plurality voting system.

Primary election

PDP primary
The PDP primary election was won by Achike Udenwa.

Results
The total number of registered voters in the state was 1,627,939. Total number of votes cast was 799,248 while number of valid votes was 783,051. Rejected votes were 16,197.

References 

Imo State gubernatorial elections
Imo State gubernatorial election
Imo State gubernatorial election
Imo State gubernatorial election